The 2017–18 California Golden Bears women's basketball team represents University of California, Berkeley during the 2017–18 NCAA Division I women's basketball season. The Golden Bears, led by seventh year head coach Lindsay Gottlieb, play their home games at the Haas Pavilion and were members of the Pac-12 Conference. They finished the season 21–11, 11–7 in Pac-12 play to finish in fifth place. They advanced to the quarterfinals of the Pac-12 women's tournament where they lost to UCLA. They received at-large bid to the NCAA women's tournament where they got upset by Virginia in the first round.

Roster

Schedule

|-
!colspan=9 style="background:#; color:#FFCC33;"|Exhibition

|-
!colspan=9 style="background:#; color:#FFCC33;"|Non-conference regular season

|-
!colspan=9 style="background:#; color:#FFCC33;"| Pac-12 regular season

|-
!colspan=9 style="background:#; color:#FFCC33;"| Pac-12 Women's Tournament

|-
!colspan=9 style="background:#; color:#FFCC33;"| NCAA Women's Tournament

Rankings

See also
2017–18 California Golden Bears men's basketball team

References

California Golden Bears women's basketball seasons
California
California
Golden Bear
Golden Bear